Napasorn Weerayuttvilail (born 20 January 1997), nicknamed Puimek, is a Thai actress, and singer. She is known for her roles as Earn in Turn Left Turn Right, Mon in the hit Thai Television Series The Gifted and The Gifted: Graduation, Ainam in My Dear Loser: Edge of 17, and Khao Fang in SOTUS S. She is an artist under GMMTV.

Early life and education 
Napasorn was born in Bangkok, Thailand. In her teens, she started her career as an actress in several music videos and series. Besides working as a full-time actress, Napasorn has also been busy with her studies. She finished and graduated high school at Rajini School and is currently studying in Rangsit University at the College of Medicine and currently training at Rajavithi Hospital.

Filmography 
Napasorn began her stint in the entertainment industry by shooting and acting on several music videos. In 2017, she debuted as a television actress in the series "U-Prince: The Badly Politics" as one of the main characters, Princess Karin. She is an artist under GMMTV and has been working constantly in a pile of projects.

Discography

External links 

 Napasorn Weerayuttvilai on Instagram

References 

Living people
1997 births
Napasorn Weerayuttvilai
Napasorn Weerayuttvilai
Napasorn Weerayuttvilai